The 16th Houston Film Critics Society Awards were announced on February 18, 2023, at the Midtown Arts & Theater Center Houston (MATCH) in Texas. The nominations were announced on January 10, 2023, with The Banshees of Inisherin and Everything Everywhere All at Once leading the nominations with nine each. Both films won the most awards with three each, with Everything Everywhere All at Once winning Best Picture. The nominees for the Texas Independent Film Award were announced on December 7, 2022.

Hosted by local film critics and film industry notables, the event featured live, abridged performances of the five Best Original Song nominees, which went to "Naatu Naatu" from RRR, and the awarding of the Texas Independent Film Award. "As the industry continues to debate how we should experience the magic of film, moviemakers continue to imagine creative stories about compelling people," said Douglas Harris, HFCS President. "This year, the films we honor showcase a community daring to rethink, refresh and reinvent," she concluded.

The performances of the five nominated songs were performed by local performers Sheleah Monea, Cameron Starnes, and Sankar Narayanan, under the direction of music director Scott Benton, and the presence of the Consuls General of Argentina, Belgium, Germany and Korea for the presentation of Best Foreign Language Feature. Following the two-hour production, guests adjourned to the Gallery at MATCH for a reception featuring an Everything Everywhere All at Once-themed bagel buffet courtesy of Ziggy Gruber of Kenny and Ziggy's New York Delicatessen and Barry Shapiro of Bagel Express. "As we celebrate a year when we rediscovered the joy of the movies, our critics applaud a film that dares to push the art in every possible way," Harris said. "Just as we have in so many previous award years, the Houston Critics look for opportunities to honor filmmakers who dare to bring something new to the screen. Each year, the Society presents our awards after thoroughly reviewing the year's films," she continued. "We select our nominees in December before casting final votes early in the new year. As professional journalists who believe in the power of film, we are thrilled with the range and substance of this year's winners," Harris concluded.

Winners and nominees

Winners are listed first and highlighted with boldface.

References

External links
 Official website

2023 in Texas
2022 film awards
2022
Houston